The Dennis RS/SS series was a range of fire engine chassis built by Hestair Dennis (later Dennis Specialist Vehicles), produced from 1978 until the early 1990s.

Features
Internally codenamed Retained, Steel, the Dennis RS series was first launched in 1979, initially not offered with a tilting cab due to a belief that few fire stations at the time could accommodate a tilting cab. A lower-cost alternative named the Standard Specification, or SS series, was launched shortly afterwards, however at the request of the London Fire Brigade, this would be fitted with a tilting front cab as standard to improve ease of maintenance. The all-steel cab, designed by Ogle Design, replaced the older fibreglass and wood construction of the previous appliances it succeeded, such as the Dennis D and Dennis R, increasing the strength of the cab overall in the event of a collision.

The first of the Dennis RS/SS fire appliances were fitted with Perkins V8 diesel engines, either the V8-540 or the V8-640, with or without turbochargers; by 1987, the RS and SS could be specified with Cummins C-series engines. Early appliances were bodied in-house by Dennis at their Woodbridge factory, but when in-house fire engine bodying was discontinued in 1985, the bodying of the Dennis RS/SS series and derivative products was outsourced to other coachbuilders, primarily to Carmichael Fire. The RS could also be fitted with a variety of bodies by other coachbuilders including HCB Angus, Fulton Wylie and Saxon Specialist Vehicles.

Over 1,750 Dennis RS/SS fire engines would be produced, being sold to nearly all fire brigades across the United Kingdom as well as being exported to various fire brigades worldwide. As the appliances aged, RS and SS series appliances were known to suffer from corrosion particularly around the cab doors, nicknamed "Dennis Disease" by mechanics.

Variants
 RS130/SS130 - Perkins V8-540 engine with Turner T5.400 manual gearbox
 RS131/SS131 - Perkins V8-540 engine with Allison MT643 automatic gearbox
 RS132/SS132 - Perkins V8-540 engine with ZF S6.65 manual gearbox
 RS133/SS133 - Perkins V8-640 engine with Allison MT643 automatic gearbox
 RS134/SS134 - Perkins TV8-540 engine with ZF S6.65 manual gearbox
 RS135/SS135 - Perkins TV8-540 engine with Allison MT643 automatic gearbox
 RS137/SS137 - Perkins V8-540 engine with Allison MT643 automatic gearbox

All chassis came with a choice of a 500gpm or 1,000gpm two-stage Godiva fire pump, depending on application, and a  emergency water tank.

Significant operators

United Kingdom
 London Fire Brigade - Still operating 107 SS137s by 1995
 Cheshire Fire and Rescue Service
 Essex County Fire and Rescue Service
 Greater Manchester Fire and Rescue Service
 Hampshire Fire and Rescue Service
 Hertfordshire Fire and Rescue Service
 Humberside Fire and Rescue Service
 Kent Fire and Rescue Service
 Merseyside Fire and Rescue Service
 Northern Ireland Fire Brigade
 Staffordshire Fire and Rescue Service 
 West Midlands Fire Service
 West Yorkshire Fire and Rescue Service

Republic of Ireland
 Dublin Fire Brigade
 Civil Defence Ireland

Elsewhere
 Hong Kong Fire Services Department
 Singapore Fire Service
 Romania-former UK vehicles, as donations
 Johannesburg Fire and Rescue
 City of Cape Town
 East London Fire Brigade
 City of Port Elizabeth (now Nelson Mandela Metropolitan Municipality)

References

Fire engines
RS/SS series
Vehicles introduced in 1978